During the 2006–07 season, Club Brugge KV participated in the Belgian First Division.

Season summary
Following a 0-1 home loss to Roeselare, coach Emilio Ferrera and assistant Franky Van der Elst were fired, with sports director Marc Degryse also resigning. Ex-player Čedomir Janevski was appointed as the new manager, leading Club Brugge to the Belgian Cup and UEFA Cup qualification. At the end of the season, Jacky Mathijssen was appointed head coach.

First-team squad
Squad at end of season

Left club during season

Results

UEFA Cup

References

Notes

2006–07
Belgian football clubs 2006–07 season